Nicolás Cavigliasso (born 3 September 1991) is an Argentine four-wheeler motorcycle rider. In 2017, he won the Merzouga Dakar Series in Morocco (Six Day Dakar), and he was Argentine champion of Quadcross X, 4x2 ATV Quads.

He won the 2019 Dakar Rally in the quad category from start to finish, winning 9 of the 10 stages.

References

Sportspeople from Córdoba Province, Argentina
1991 births
Living people
Enduro riders
Argentine motorcycle racers
Dakar Rally motorcyclists
Dakar Rally winning drivers
Off-road motorcycle racers
21st-century Argentine people